Stefano Aguiar dos Santos (born 3 March 1976) more commonly known as Stefano Aguiar is a Brazilian politician and pastor. He has spent his political career representing his home state of Minas Gerais, having served as state representative since 2015.

Personal life
He is the child of Geraldo Aguiar dos Santos and Maria Aparecida de Oliveira Santos. Aguiar is a pastor, theologian, and secretary of the Foursquare Gospel church. His father Geraldo Aguiar, as well as his uncles Mario de Oliveira and Antônio Genaro are also pastors of the foursquare church.

Political career
Aguiar served as a caretacker role of Federal deputy after his uncle Mario de Oliveira resigned in 2012.

Aguiar voted in favor of the impeachment of then-president Dilma Rousseff. Aguiar voted against the 2017 Brazilian labor reform, and would vote in favor of a corruption investigation into Rousseff's successor Michel Temer.

References

1976 births
Living people
People from Belo Horizonte
Brazilian Pentecostal pastors
Members of the Foursquare Church
Social Christian Party (Brazil) politicians
Brazilian Socialist Party politicians
Social Democratic Party (Brazil, 2011) politicians
Members of the Chamber of Deputies (Brazil) from Minas Gerais